Kauvery Hospital is a multi-specialty Indian hospital chain based in Trichy and Hospitals located in Trichy, Chennai,Hosur,Tirunelveli and Salem, Bengaluru

About

History 

 1999 - Started in Trichy as a 30-bed Kaveri Medical Centre
 2002 - KMC Speciality hospital has renamed as Kauvery Hospital
 2004 - First Cardiac centre opened in Trichy 
 2008 - In February 2008, the company acquired Seahorse Hospital 
 2011 - Kauvery Hospital was launched in Chennai
 2014 - Kauvery Medical Centre, Karaikudi was inaugurated
 2019 - Kauvery Hospital was launched in Bangalore (electronic city)

Specializations 

Cardiology, Nephrology, Urology, Pediatrics, Gastroenterology, Neurology, Spine Surgery, Geriatrics, Orthopaedics, Vascular Surgery, Anesthesiology, Endocrinology, Interventional Radiology, Pediatric Cardiology, Radiology, Critical Care, ENT, Head and Neck Surgery, Plastic Surgery, Rheumatology, Obstetrics and Gynecology, Dental & Maxillofacial, Psychiatry, 
Dermatology, Orthogeriatrics and Pulmonology.

Awards 

 Platinum Medal & Certification for the Best Practices in 5S in Large & Medium Scale Industries
 Quality Certification from National Accreditation Board for Hospitals (NABH)
 Best IT Users Award- 2007
 Best Cancer, Heart & Trauma Care Hospital Award - 2006
 Best Heart & Cancer Care Hospital Award - 2005
 Best Accident and Emergency Care Hospital Award - 2003
 Best Multi-Specialty Hospital Award -2001
5S - Award from ABK-AOTS - 2017
IDC Insights Awards 2017 - a pioneering initiative under Excellence in Operations using digital platform
Pioneer in Healthcare in Tamil Nadu by FICCI Group - 2017
Big 50 CISO Award - TRESCON, Trichy - 2017
DL SHAH awards - Quality Council of India, Delhi - 2017
Best Private hospital award from FICCI TNSC  with Ministry of Health &Family Welfare, Government of Tamil Nadu - 2016
Kauvery Hospital Bangalore was ranked as one of the Best Emerging Hospitals In South India by the Times Health - All India Multi-speciality Hospitals Ranking Survey 2021.

References

Hospitals in Tamil Nadu
Hospitals in Chennai
Hospitals in Tiruchirappalli
Health care companies of India
Hospital networks in India
1999 establishments in Tamil Nadu
Indian companies established in 1999
Companies listed on the Bombay Stock Exchange